(died 10 March 531) was the 26th legendary emperor of Japan, according to the traditional order of succession.

No firm dates can be assigned to this emperor's life or reign, but he is conventionally considered to have reigned from 3 March 507 to 10 March 531.

Legendary narrative
Keitai is considered to have ruled the country during the early-6th century, but there is a paucity of information about him. There is insufficient material available for further verification and study. Significant differences exist in the records of the Kojiki and the Nihon Shoki.

The Kojiki puts this emperor's birth year at 485; and his date of death is said to have been April 9, 527. In the extant account, he is called .

The Nihon Shoki gives his birth year at 450; and he is said to have died on February 7, 531 or 534.

In other historical records, he is said to have originally been King of Koshi, a smaller tribal entity, apparently in northern parts of central Japan, perhaps as far as the coast of Sea of Japan. Some modern reference works of history call Keitai simply King Ohodo of Koshi.

Keitai's contemporary title would not have been tennō, as most historians believe this title was not introduced until the reigns of Emperor Tenmu and Empress Jitō. Rather, it was presumably , meaning "the great king who rules all under heaven".

Genealogy
Keitai was not the son of the immediate previous monarch. According to the Kojiki and Nihon Shoki, Buretsu died without a successor, at which time a fifth generation grandson of Emperor Ōjin, Keitai, came and ascended the throne.

If Emperor Keitai began a new dynasty as some historians believe, then Emperor Buretsu would have been the last monarch of the first recorded dynasty of Japan.

When Buretsu died, Kanamura recommended Keitai (at the age of 58) as a possible heir to the Yamato throne. His mother, Furihime, was a seventh generation descendant of Emperor Suinin by his son, Prince Iwatsukuwake. His father was a fourth generation descendant of Emperor Ōjin by his son, Prince Wakanuke no Futamata.

Genealogy information is supplemented in Shaku Nihongi which quotes from the now lost text Jōgūki (7th century). It says he was a son of Ushi no Ōkimi (believed to be equivalent to Hikoushi no Ōkimi), a grandson of Ohi no Ōkimi, a great-grandson of Ohohoto no Ōkimi (brother to Emperor Ingyō's consort), a great-great-grandson of Prince Wakanuke no Futamata, and a great-great-great-grandson of Emperor Ōjin.

The genealogical trees of the Nihon Shoki have been lost, and the accuracy of its account of events remains unknown. This uncertainty raises arguable doubts about this emperor's genealogy.

Although genealogical information in the Shaku Nihongi leaves room for discussion, many scholars acknowledge the blood relationship with the Okinaga clan, a powerful local ruling family or the collateral line of the Imperial family-governed Ōmi region (a part of present-day Shiga Prefecture). This family produced many empresses and consorts throughout history. According to the Nihon Shoki, Ohohoto no Ōkimi, the great-grandfather of Emperor Keitai, married into the Okinaga clan. Keitai's mother, Furihime, was from a local ruling family in Koshi (Echizen Province), so his mother brought him to her home after his father's death. Abundant traditions relating to the family have been passed down by shrines and old-established families in both regions.

Regardless of speculation about Keitai's genealogy, it is well settled that there was an extended period of disputes over the succession which developed after Keitai's death. A confrontation arose between adherents of two branches of the Yamato, pitting the supporters of sons who would become known as Emperor Ankan and Emperor Senka against those who were backers of the son who would become known as Emperor Kinmei.

Keitai's reign
Keitai declared his ascension in Kusuba, in the northern part of Kawachi Province (present day Shijonawate, Osaka), and married a younger sister of Emperor Buretsu, Princess Tashiraka. It is supposed that his succession was not welcomed by everyone, and it took about 20 years for Keitai to enter Yamato Province, near Kawachi and the political center of Japan at the time.

In Keitai's later years, 527 or 528, the Iwai Rebellion broke out in Tsukushi province, Kyūshū. Keitai assigned Mononobe no Arakabi as Shōgun and sent him to Kyūshū to put down the rebellion.

Among his sons, Emperor Ankan, Emperor Senka and Emperor Kinmei ascended to the throne.

The actual site of Keitai's grave is not known. He is traditionally venerated at a memorial Shinto shrine (misasagi) at the Ooda Chausuyama kofun in Ibaraki, Osaka.

The Imperial Household Agency designates this location as Keitai's mausoleum. It is formally named Mishima no Aikinu no misasagi.

Consorts and children
Empress: , Emperor Ninken's daughter
, later Prince Ahohiko
Emperor Kinmei (欽明天皇)

Consort: , Owari no Muraji Kusaka's daughter
First Son: , later Emperor Ankan
Second son: , later Emperor Senka

Consort: , Mio no Tsunoori no Kimi's younger sister

Consort: , Prince Sakata no Ōmata's daughter

Consort: , daughter of 
, Saiō

Consort: , daughter of 

Consort: , daughter of 

Consort: , daughter of 

Consort: , daughter of

See also
 The civil war of the Keitai and Kinmei dynasties
 Emperor of Japan
 List of Emperors of Japan
 Imperial cult

Notes

References

 Aston, William George. (1896).  Nihongi: Chronicles of Japan from the Earliest Times to A.D. 697. London: Kegan Paul, Trench, Trubner. 
 Brown, Delmer M. and Ichirō Ishida, eds. (1979).  Gukanshō: The Future and the Past. Berkeley: University of California Press. ; 
 Hall, John Whitney. (1993). The Cambridge history of Japan: Ancient Japan, Vol. I. Cambridge: Cambridge University Press. 
 Kim Yong Woon (2009). History and the Future are One (천황은 백제어로 말한다). Seoul.
 Ponsonby-Fane, Richard Arthur Brabazon. (1959).  The Imperial House of Japan. Kyoto: Ponsonby Memorial Society. 
 Seeley, Christopher. (1991). A History of Writing in Japan. Leiden: Brill Publishers. —reprinted by University of Hawaii Press (2000). 
 Titsingh, Isaac. (1834). Nihon Ōdai Ichiran; ou,  Annales des empereurs du Japon.  Paris: Royal Asiatic Society, Oriental Translation Fund of Great Britain and Ireland. 
 Varley, H. Paul. (1980).  Jinnō Shōtōki: A Chronicle of Gods and Sovereigns. New York: Columbia University Press. ; 

 
 

Japanese emperors
People from Fukui Prefecture
People of Kofun-period Japan
6th-century monarchs in Asia
6th-century Japanese monarchs
450 births
530s deaths
Year of death uncertain